XHDZ-FM is a radio station on 88.1 FM in Córdoba, Veracruz, Mexico. It is known as Retro FM with a classic hits format.

History
XEDZ-AM 580 received its concession on September 17, 1951. It was owned by Juana María Jácome Vda. de Zuñiga and broadcast with 1,000 watts day and 450 night. The current concessionaire acquired it in 1964.

XEDZ moved to FM in 2012.

In August 2019, Grupo Radiorama became the operator of XHDZ. The station changed from pop "Hit 88.1" to Audiorama's Retro FM brand.

References

1951 establishments in Mexico
Radio stations established in 1951
Radio stations in Veracruz
Spanish-language radio stations